Coodham, also previously known as Cowdam or Cowdams, is a place near Symington in South Ayrshire, Scotland. The lands were held by the Mure family in the 14th century.

References
Paterson, James. History of the county of Ayr, Volume 2. 1852.

History of South Ayrshire